Maxates glaucaria is a moth in the  family Geometridae. It is found in Taiwan.

References

Moths described in 1866
Hemitheini